Gurdev Singh Badal was an Indian politician and member of the Shiromani Akali Dal. Badal was a member of the Punjab Legislative Assembly from the Panjgrain constituency in Faridkot district.

Badal died at Dayanand Medical College and Hospital, Ludhiana on 28 March 2017.

References 

2017 deaths
People from Jalandhar district
Shiromani Akali Dal politicians
Members of the Punjab Legislative Assembly
Punjab, India MLAs 1977–1980
Punjab, India MLAs 1980–1985
Punjab, India MLAs 1985–1990
Punjab, India MLAs 1997–2002
Punjab, India MLAs 2002–2007
Year of birth missing